Luis Alberto Miramontes (born 15 November 1928) was a Uruguayan footballer. He played in 22 matches for the Uruguay national football team from 1956 to 1959. He was also part of Uruguay's squad for the 1956 South American Championship.

References

External links
 
 

1928 births
Possibly living people
Uruguayan footballers
Uruguay international footballers
Place of birth missing (living people)
Association football midfielders
Defensor Sporting players